Huang Wei-che (born 26 September 1963) is a Taiwanese politician. He was a member of the Legislative Yuan from 2005 to 2018. Huang is the incumbent Mayor of Tainan since 25 December 2018 after winning the title during the 2018 local elections on 24 November 2018.

Education
Huang attended Taipei Municipal Jianguo High School. He then continued his higher education at National Taiwan University for his bachelor's degree and at Harvard University and Yale University in the United States for his master's degrees.

Political career
Huang was a member of the Legislative Yuan from 2005 to 2018.

2018 Tainan City mayoral election

References

External links

 

1963 births
Living people
Harvard University alumni
Mayors of Tainan
National Taiwan University alumni
Tainan Members of the Legislative Yuan
Members of the 6th Legislative Yuan
Members of the 7th Legislative Yuan
Members of the 8th Legislative Yuan
Members of the 9th Legislative Yuan
Yale University alumni
Democratic Progressive Party Members of the Legislative Yuan